The 1986 British motorcycle Grand Prix was the ninth round of the 1986 Grand Prix motorcycle racing season. It took place on the weekend of 1–3 August 1986 at the Silverstone Circuit. This was the last motorcycle race held at Silverstone, before the race was moved to Donington Park for the 1987 season.

Classification

500 cc

References

British motorcycle Grand Prix
British
Motorcycle Grand Prix